Toni-Ann Singh (born February 1, 1996) is a Jamaican beauty queen who won Miss World 2019. She was previously crowned Miss Jamaica World 2019 and is the fourth woman from Jamaica to win Miss World. She is also the longest-reigning Miss World in the history of the pageant.

Early life and education 
Singh was born in Morant Bay, Jamaica. She is of Dougla heritage, with her mother being of Afro-Jamaican descent, and her father being of Indo-Jamaican descent.

Her family immigrated to the United States when Singh was aged nine, settling in Florida. She attended Florida State University in Tallahassee, where she graduated with a degree in women's studies and psychology.

Career

Miss Jamaica World 2019 
In 2019, Singh competed in the Miss Jamaica World 2019 competition, where she ultimately won the title. Afterwards, Singh was given the right to represent Jamaica at Miss World 2019.

Miss World 2019 
Singh left for London in November 2019, to participate in the Miss World pre-pageant activities. Singh placed in the top 40 of the Top Model competition and won the talent competition, which granted her direct entry into the top 40 semifinals. Finals night was held on 14 December at ExCeL London, where Singh advanced from the top 40 to the top 12, and ultimately to the top five.

During the top 5 question and answer round, she was asked by Piers Morgan - "Why should you win the title of Miss World 2019?" Toni went onto answer the question by saying:
"I think I represent something special...a generation of women who are pushing forward to change the world. I don't consider myself better than any other girls on the stage, but I will say that my passion for women and making sure that they have had the same opportunities that I have had, is something that sets me apart."

She was subsequently asked, "Who is the most inspiring woman in the world for you?" to which she expressed:
"The most inspiring woman to me is my mother. Now I must say, if my mother and my father are the roots, and I'm the tree, then really, any work that I do, anything that I'm able to change in the world...It is the fruits of their labor and I watched her pour everything into me, even at the sacrifice of her own wants and her needs, and that's why I am able to sit before you today."

At the end of the event, she was eventually crowned as Miss World 2019 by the outgoing title holder Vanessa Ponce of Mexico, besting first runner-up Ophély Mézino of France and second runner-up Suman Rao of India.

With her win, Singh became the fourth Jamaican woman to hold the title, with the last being Lisa Hanna who was crowned Miss World 1993, and the first black woman to win Miss World since Agbani Darego of Nigeria won Miss World 2001. Her win also made 2019 the first ever year that black women won the two of the Big Four most prestigious beauty pageant titles in the world, after Zozibini Tunzi became South Africa's first black woman to have won the Miss Universe title.

During her reign as Miss World, she lived in England and visited Indonesia, Nepal, Puerto Rico, USA, Mauritius, South Africa, and Jamaica.

References

External links 

1996 births
Florida State University alumni
21st-century Jamaican women singers
Jamaican beauty pageant winners
Jamaican emigrants to the United States
Living people
Miss Jamaica World winners
Miss World 2019 delegates
Miss World winners
People from Saint Thomas Parish, Jamaica
Jamaican people of Indian descent